The 2008 BAFL Season is the British American Football League. BritBowl XXII, the league's championship game, was scheduled to be played at Keepmoat Stadium in Doncaster on September 21, 2008. The regular season began on May 4 with the BritBowl champions London Blitz defeating the Gateshead Senators 48-0.

Schedule

Regular season

Formula 
Based on the British American Football League, setup for the 2008 season there will be a 3 tier structure consisting of:

Final regular season standings 

W = Wins, L = Losses, T = Ties, PCT = Winning Percentage, PF= Points For, PA = Points Against

Clinched playoff seeds are marked in parentheses and shaded in green, for BAFL 2 divisions the colours have been changed to indicate Northern and Southern sides of the Playoffs.

BAFL Premier standings

BAFL Division 1 standings

BAFL Division 2 standings

Playoffs 
The playoffs are scheduled to start on August 24, 2008.  BritBowl XXII will then be played on September 21, 2008 at Keepmoat Stadium in Doncaster.

BAFL Premier Playoff

BAFL Premier Championship Game/BritBowl

BAFL 1 Playoff

BAFL 1 Championship Game

BAFL 2 Playoff 

The BAFL 2 Playoffs are split geographically between the North and the South. The Southern half of the draw includes the top two teams from each of the East, South East and South West. With the top two from the Northern and Central conferences making up the Northern half.

BAFL 2 Championship Game

Bracket

See also 
BritBowl

British American Football League
BAFL season
BAFL season